Michael Raven (born 1964) is an American pornographic film director. He is a member of the AVN Hall of Fame.

Raven met his wife Sydnee Steele while working as a car salesman. They married, finding a common interest in pornography and swinging, and moved to Los Angeles, California to turn their hobbies into careers. Their marriage lasted for ten years.

Awards
 2001 AVN Award - Best Editing, Film (Watchers) with Sammy Slater
 2001 AVN Award - Best Screenplay, Film (Watchers) with George Kaplan
 2003 AVN Award - Best Director, Video (Breathless)
 2003 AVN Award - Best Screenplay, Film (Breathless) with Devan Sapphire
 2004 AVN Award - Best Director, Video (Beautiful)
 2004 AVN Award - Best Screenplay, Video (Beautiful)
 2008 AVN Hall of Fame inductee

References

External links
 
 
 

Living people
1964 births
American film directors
American pornographic film directors
American pornographic film producers